Eoghan Ó hEidhin (died 1340) was King of Uí Fiachrach Aidhne.

Eoghan is the last person named as ruler of all Uí Fiachrach Aidhne in the annals. The previous person so named was Owen Ó hEidhin who died in 1253. The Irish annals list two possible rulers in the interim:

 1263. Mael Fabhill Ó hEidhin was slain by the English.
 1326. Nicholas Ó hEidhin died.

However, neither is specifically stated as being king. 

According to the annals, "Eoghan ... was slain by his own kinsmen." No further details are given. His family would remain rulers of the sub-district of Coill Ua bhFhiachrach till displaced in the 1650s by the Cromwellian administration. However, as late as 1840 there was a recognised head of the family, living near Kinvara.

See also

References
 Irish Kings and High-Kings, Francis John Byrne (2001), Dublin: Four Courts Press, 
 CELT: Corpus of Electronic Texts at University College Cork

People from County Galway
1340 deaths
14th-century Irish monarchs
Year of birth unknown
Gaels